Muskego is a city in Waukesha County, Wisconsin, United States. As of the 2020 census, the city had a population of 25,032.  Muskego is the fifth largest community in Waukesha County, Wisconsin. Muskego has a large Norwegian population. The name Muskego is derived from the Potawatomi Indian name for the area, "Mus-kee-Guaac", meaning sunfish. The Potawatomi were the original inhabitants of Muskego. There are three lakes within the city's boundaries.

History
The history of Muskego started originally as the home of the Potawatomi, who named it "Mus-kee-Guaac", which means "sunfish". The first European came in 1827 and a few years later (1833), the Potawatomi tribe ceded their lands in Wisconsin to the United States government. The first permanent settlers, coming from New Hampshire, were the Luther Parker family.

Once an agricultural area, Muskego was incorporated as a city in 1964. When it became a city it included the unincorporated communities of Durham Hill and Tess Corners. With an increase in housing developments in the city, it has become a bedroom community for Milwaukee.

Muskego Beach Amusement Park
Muskego Beach Amusement Park (1861–1967), later known as DandiLion Park (1968–1977), was a popular amusement park located on the southern bank of Little Muskego Lake. It was at some point home of the world's fastest roller coaster.

Charles Rose, operator of Wisconsin State Fair Park purchased Muskego Beach Amusement Park from Mrs. William Boszhardt in 1944. After World War II, he reopened it. The park included rides, games of chance, and was a venue for musical bands. Charles Rose died in 1963 and five years later, Willard Masterson purchased the park. He renamed it "DandiLion Park" and added more amusement rides, including the Tailspin roller coaster. In 1974, an eleven-year-old boy fell from the Ferris wheel and died.

Geography

Muskego contains three lakes within its borders: Big Muskego Lake, Little Muskego Lake, and Lake Denoon.

Big Muskego Lake is a shallow  flow-through lake in south-central Muskego. Most of the lake is less than four feet deep with a generally organic or muck bottom. Big Muskego Lake is fringed with cattail-dominated wetlands and encompasses numerous islands of cattail marsh. Bass Bay is a  connected embayment of Big Muskego Lake that has a deeper basin typical of other glacially formed kettle lakes in the region.

Little Muskego Lake is a  flow-through lake with extensive shallow margins and a single deep basin. The bottom substrate predominantly consists of silt or muck. Residents and visitors to Little Muskego Lake enjoy a variety of lake-related recreational activities, including boating, skiing, sailing, and fishing. The Muskego Waterbugs perform a water ski show in front of Idle Isle Park each Wednesday evening throughout the summer. The lake contains many fish species including: largemouth bass, northern pike, walleye, and several panfish species. Most of the shores of Little Muskego Lake are developed with residential housing.

Lake Denoon is a  lake in the southwestern portion of the city and is also partially located in the Town of Norway, Wisconsin. An outlet stream on the south end drains to Ke-Nong-Go-Mong (Long) Lake in Racine County. A cattail island and an extent of cattail shoreline are found on the lake's west end. The remaining lakeshore is mostly developed with residential housing.

A plan to drain the lakes, which were described as a stagnant nuisance, was proposed in 1854.

Climate

Demographics

Muskego is the fifth largest place in Waukesha County, after City of Waukesha, City of New Berlin, City of Brookfield, and Town of Menomonee Falls, based on 2010 and estimated 2019 population. 

As of 2000 the median income for a household in the city was $64,247, and the median income for a family was $69,722. Males had a median income of $49,386 versus $30,714 for females. The per capita income for the city was $26,199. About 1.0% of families and 1.6% of the population were below the poverty line, including 1.9% of those under age 18 and 2.8% of those age 65 or over.

2010 census
As of the census of 2010, there were 24,135 people, 9,068 households, and 7,011 families residing in the city. The racial makeup of the city was 97.2% White, 0.3% African American, 0.2% Native American, 0.9% Asian, 0.4% from other races, and 1.0% from two or more races. Hispanic or Latino of any race were 2.3% of the population.

There were 9,068 households, of which 35.7% had children under the age of 18 living with them, 66.6% were married couples living together, 7.0% had a female householder with no husband present, 3.7% had a male householder with no wife present, and 22.7% were non-families. 18.6% of all households were made up of individuals, and 8.6% had someone living alone who was 65 years of age or older. The average household size was 2.65 and the average family size was 3.03.

The median age in the city was 42.4 years. 25.1% of residents were under the age of 18; 6.3% were between the ages of 18 and 24; 23.3% were from 25 to 44; 32.4% were from 45 to 64; and 12.9% were 65 years of age or older. The gender makeup of the city was 49.3% male and 50.7% female.

Government
The first Mayor of the city was Jerome Gottfried, elected in 1964. He was followed by Donald Wieselmann, Wayne Salentine, David DeAngelis, Mark Slocomb, Charles Damaske, John Johnson, Kathy Chiaverotti and Rick Petfalski.

Muskego is served by the Tess Corners Fire Department, a volunteer fire department.

Education

Public schools:
Muskego-Norway School District:
 Bay Lane Elementary
 Lakeview Elementary (serves Muskego residents, but located in the Town of Norway)
 Mill Valley Elementary
 Muskego Lakes Middle School
 Lake Denoon Middle School
 Muskego High School

Parochial schools:
 St. Leonard K–8 Catholic School
 St. Paul's Ev. Lutheran Grade School – WELS

Notable people

 Henry Lockney, Wisconsin State Senator and jurist, born in the town of Muskego
 Andrija Novakovich, association footballer, born in Muskego
 Luther Parker, Wisconsin territorial legislator, settler, and pioneer, lived in Muskego
 Howard Schmidt, cyber security advisor, lived in Muskego
 Chuck Wichgers, Wisconsin State Representative, lived in Muskego

See also
 Muskego Settlement

References

External links
 City of Muskego
 Muskego Chamber of Commerce Website
 

Cities in Wisconsin
Cities in Waukesha County, Wisconsin
Populated places established in 1964